Juliya is a 2009 Sri Lankan Sinhala comedy film directed by Sampath Sri Roshan and produced by Charith Abeysinghe for Studio X Films. It stars both Roshan and Abeysinghe themselves with Nadeesha Hemamali along with Sasanthi Jayasekara and Ravindra Randeniya. The music was composed by Ranga Dasanayake. The film introduced high definition cinema to the country and was the first local movie to debut at an international theatre, the Odeon, Empire Leicester Square, England.

It is the 1,165th film in the Sinhala cinema.

Plot
Dilrukshan (Charith Abeysinghe) the only son of a rich family after murdering his love leaves for London while his father shoots himself and dies. After some years he returns home and develop a love affair with Julia (Sasanthi Jayasekara), the daughter of a wealthy family. However, he was unable to proceed long as Dev (Sampath Sri Roshan) who too has been in London returns home in search of the culprit who murdered his sister.

Cast
 Sampath Sri Roshan as Dev
 Sasanthi Jayasekara as Shakie
 Charith Abeysinghe as Dilru
 Nadeesha Hemamali as Juliya
 Ravindra Randeniya 
 Robin Fernando as George Lewke Bandara
 Veena Jayakody as Mrs. Lewke Bandara
 Sriyantha Mendis as Lesli
 Rex Kodippili
 Sandun Wijesiri
 Sanet Dikkumbura 
 Teddy Vidyalankara as Lesli's henchman
 Harsha Bulathsinghala
 Achala Walpola

Soundtrack

Reception
The film received mixed reviews from critics. The Daily News stated that "Julia is a movie with stunning cinematography, photography and cast performance but still and all, it disappoints the viewer because it looks like an empty-shelled blockbuster.

References

2009 films
2000s Sinhala-language films